Firebugs is a futuristic racing video game developed by Attention to Detail and published by Sony Computer Entertainment exclusively for PlayStation.

Gameplay

The player takes control of one of five vehicles in a futuristic race where speeds can reach over 400 miles per hour. Weapons and defences are used to help the player win races. The game modes include 1 player mode where the player can race on 25 tracks in 5 distinct worlds (Archipelago, Droid Gardens, Sky Dunes, Sky Port and Cloud City). There is 2 player mode which consists of the same basics as in one player mode.

Soundtrack
The game's soundtrack includes music from hip-hop group Bomfunk MCs, whose songs "We R Atomic" and "Put Ya Hands Up" are featured. These are of note because the album Burnin' Sneakers was not released in the UK , and so the songs have correlation to this game for many UK fans.

Critical reception 
Firebugs received positive reviews in the Evening Chronicle, the Birmingham Mail, and the Waikato Times.

References

External links
 Firebugs on Moby Games
 Firebugs can be played for free in the browser on the Internet Archive

2002 video games
Attention to Detail games
Europe-exclusive video games
Science fiction racing games
PlayStation (console) games
PlayStation (console)-only games
Sony Interactive Entertainment games
Video games developed in the United Kingdom
Multiplayer and single-player video games